Tom Byrom (17 March 1920 – November 1997) was an English footballer, who played as a wing half in the Football League for Tranmere Rovers.

References

External links

1920 births
1997 deaths
Association football wing halves
English Football League players
English footballers
Tranmere Rovers F.C. players